Red Army Strait (Proliv Krasnoy Army) is a strait in Severnaya Zemlya, Russia. It is named after the Red Army (Krasnaya Armiya).

Geography
It separates Komsomolets Island in the north from October Revolution Island in the south and connects the Kara Sea in the west with the Laptev Sea in the east. The Yuny Strait, separating Pioneer Island from Komsomolets Island, branches to the northwest in the eastern part of the strait. 

The huge Academy of Sciences Glacier reaches the shore all along the northern side of the strait, while the smaller Rusanov Glacier flanks the eastern part of its southern shore. Cape October is located in the northern shore of October Revolution Island, facing the Red Army Strait.

References

Straits of the Laptev Sea
Straits of the Kara Sea
Straits of Severnaya Zemlya